Tolhuin Department is a department of Argentina in Tierra del Fuego Province, Argentina. It was established on October 27, 2017, by law of the provincial legislature. The capital city of the department is situated in Tolhuin. It was previously part of the Río Grande Department.

References

Departments of Tierra del Fuego Province, Argentina
States and territories established in 2017
2017 establishments in Argentina